This is a list of the tornadoes which occurred during the April 6–8, 2006 tornado outbreak.

Confirmed tornadoes

April 6 event

April 7 event

April 8 event

See also
Tornado outbreak of April 6–8, 2006

References

2006-04 outbreak
Tornadoes of 2006